Sputnik is the rural locality (a Posyolok) in Pechengsky District of Murmansk Oblast, Russia. The village is located beyond the Arctic circle, located at a height of 83 m above sea level.

References

Rural localities in Murmansk Oblast
Pechengsky District